Cesare De Sanctis may refer to:

Cesare De Sanctis (businessman) (died 1881), friend of Giuseppe Verdi
Cesare De Sanctis (composer) (1824–1916)